Darrylia kleinrosa is a species of sea snail, a marine gastropod mollusc in the family Horaiclavidae.

According to Garcia (2008), this species belongs in Darrylia and not in Miraclathurella (as proposed by DeJong & Coomans, 1988).

Description
The length of the shell attains 8.5 mm.

Distribution
This species occurs in the Caribbean Sea off Aruba, Bonaire and Curaçao.

References

 Nowell-Usticke, G. W. "A supplementary listing of new shells (illustrated)." To be added to the check list of the marine shells of St. Croix. Published privately 6 (1969).

External links
  Tucker, J.K. 2004 Catalog of recent and fossil turrids (Mollusca: Gastropoda). Zootaxa 682: 1–1295.
 
 Faber, M. J., 1988. The malacological taxa of Gordon W. Nowell-Usticke

kleinrosa
Gastropods described in 1969